Primate research center may refer to:

Barbados
The Primate Research Centre at the Barbados Wildlife Reserve, for the conservation and study of Green Monkeys.

Japan
 Primate Research Institute in Inuyamaat, Japan; affiliated with Kyoto University.

United States
 California National Primate Research Center, at University of California, Davis in Davis, California.
 Oregon National Primate Research Center, in Hillsboro, Oregon; affiliated with the Oregon Health and Science University.
 Yerkes National Primate Research Center, at Emory University in Atlanta, Georgia.